Amar Singh Sahgal (born at Bilaspur, February, 1903 ) was member of 1st Lok Sabha from Bilaspur (Lok Sabha constituency) in Madhya Pradesh State, India. He was member of 4th Lok Sabha from Bilaspur.

He was elected to 2nd  and  3rd Lok Sabha  from Janjgir (Lok Sabha constituency).

References

1903 births
People from Bilaspur, Chhattisgarh
India MPs 1962–1967
India MPs 1967–1970
India MPs 1957–1962
India MPs 1952–1957
Madhya Pradesh politicians
Lok Sabha members from Madhya Pradesh
Year of death unknown